The Experimental Security University (UNES, Universidad Nacional Experimental de la Seguridad) is a state university in Venezuela founded in 2009. It specialises in providing training for Venezuelan police and security forces, in particular the new Policía Nacional Bolivariana. UNES is part of the "new model" of policing proposed by the 2006 report of the Comisión Nacional para la Reforma Policial (CONAREPOL). CONAREPOL had proposed that the police should be specifically trained in human rights, and have a greater emphasis on crime prevention.

References

External links
University website 

Universities and colleges in Caracas
Educational institutions established in 2009
Law enforcement in Venezuela
2009 establishments in Venezuela
Venezuela